Bandabou (also: Band'abou) is a district of the island of Curaçao. It is one of the three districts, and encompasses the north-western part of the island. The district stretches from Grote Berg to Westpunt. Bandabou is Papiamentu and translates to "lower side".

History
In 1634, Curaçao was conquered by the Dutch West Indies Company and the city of Punda  was founded. In order to feed the population, plantations were established on the island. The plantations were small scale due to the infertile ground, and produced yams, mangos, oranges, or raised livestock.

In 1795, the population of Bandabou was estimated at 4,000 to 5,000 people most which were slaves. After the emancipation of slavery, small hamlets were founded in Bandabou. The Roman Catholic church started to built churches in order to educate and convert the slave population, which resulted in several small villages.

The current division of the island dates from 1930 when Willemstad was extended to include most of the suburbs.  Much of the nature in Bandabou has remained unspoilt, and the district does not experience mass tourism. The population of Bandabou often feels neglected with poor infrastructure, and a lack of economic opportunities.

Villages
 Barber
 Flip
 Lagún
 Pannekoek
 Sint Willibrordus
 Soto
 Tera Corá
 Tera Pretu
 Westpunt

See also
 Christoffelpark
 Curaçao Slave Revolt of 1795
 Willemstad

References